Samuel Marek "Milo" Anstadt (10 July 1920 – 16 July 2011) was a Dutch Jewish writer and journalist.

Biography 
Andstadt was born and lived in Lwów (Poland, nowadays Lviv in Ukraine) until 1930. At the age of 10, Milo, his parents and sister Sera emigrated to the Netherlands. In the Netherlands, he completed primary school but did not go to secondary school.

When Anstadt was fourteen years old, he worked for the Transformatorfabriek Besra in Amsterdam, he often went to ANSKI a cultural club for mostly Jewish eastern European immigrants where you could assist at political and other lectures and all kind of performances, where he also received mentoring and was helped to become more spiritually developed. Later, he received a master's degree in law from the University of Amsterdam, specializing in criminology.

In 1941, he married Lydia Bleiberg, and they had a daughter Irka in March 1942. After a warning in the evening of 9 July 1942, they had to go immediately into hiding. Their daughter was taken afterwards to a foster family in Beverwijk by the Resistance.

From 1945 to 1950, he was an editor of the magazine Vrij Nederland. For the latter two, he received the 1960 Television Award of the Prince Bernhard Foundation. In 1960, he was commissioned by Wereldvenster Publishing to write a book about Poland. It was published in 1962 under the title Polen, land, volk, cultuur.

As an employee of NRC Handelsblad, Anstadt wrote a large number of opinion articles. In 1994, he was invested as a Knight of the Order of Orange-Nassau.  He died in Amsterdam and is buried at Zorgvlied cemetery.

Bibliography 
Anstadt's works include:
 Polen, land, volk, cultuur
 Op zoek naar een mentaliteit
 Met de rede der wanhoop
 Kind in Polen
 Polen en Joden
 Jonge jaren
 De verdachte oorboog
 Servië en het westen
 En de romans De opdracht
 Is Nederland veranderd?

His novels include:
 Niets gaat voorbij
 De wankele rechtsgang van Albert Kranenburg

References

External links

1920 births
2011 deaths
Dutch columnists
Dutch journalists
Dutch jurists
20th-century Dutch historians
Dutch criminologists
Dutch male dramatists and playwrights
Dutch political writers
Dutch bibliographers
Dutch magazine editors
Dutch television directors
Dutch television producers
Jewish Dutch writers
Jewish social scientists
Jewish historians
Jewish dramatists and playwrights
Polish emigrants to the Netherlands
Knights of the Order of Orange-Nassau
University of Amsterdam alumni
20th-century Dutch dramatists and playwrights
Journalists from Amsterdam